Ayman Ben Mohamed (arabic: ايمن بن محمد; born 8 December 1994) is a professional footballer who plays as a left-back for the Tunisia national team.

Club career
Born in London to an Irish mother and Tunisian father, Mohamed and his family moved to Dublin at the age of two. In 2013, he signed for UCD while also studying Business, staying with the Students for two years before moving onto Longford Town. In November 2015, it was announced Mohamed would join Bohemians for the 2016 season.

After a string of impressive performances for The Gypsies, he attracted international attention, eventually signing for Tunisian side L’Espérance Sportive de Tunis for an undisclosed sum.

In 2017 Mohamed suffered a cruciate ligament injury, ruling him out for over a year. He returned in 2018 in his new position at left back, helping his side win the 2018 CAF Champions League Final and qualify for the 2018 FIFA Club World Cup.

A free agent after his ES Tunis contract expired in summer 2019, Mohamed joined Ligue 2 club Le Havre AC in August 2019, agreeing a contract until 2022. He made his Ligue 2 debut for the club vs Grenoble on 23 August 2019, coming on in the 82nd minute and scoring the third goal in a 3–1 win.

On 29 January 2021, Mohamed moved to Turkish club Denizlispor, on a loan deal until the end of the season.

International career
In May 2016, whilst at Bohemians Mohamed earned a surprise call-up to the Tunisia squad for the African Cup of Nations qualifier against Djibouti despite never having previously declared for The Eagles of Carthage.

On 2 October 2018, he was called up again and earned his first cap in a 2–1 victory over Niger.

Career statistics

Club

Notes

International

Honours
ES Tunis
 CAF Champions League: 2018, 2018–19
 Tunisian Ligue Professionnelle 1: 2016–17, 2017–18, 2018–19
 Tunisian Super Cup: 2019

References

1994 births
Living people
Footballers from Greater London
Association footballers from County Dublin
Tunisian footballers
Tunisia international footballers
Republic of Ireland association footballers
League of Ireland players
University College Dublin A.F.C. players
Longford Town F.C. players
Bohemian F.C. players
Tunisian Ligue Professionnelle 1 players
Espérance Sportive de Tunis players
Le Havre AC players
Denizlispor footballers
Association football wingers
Association football fullbacks
Tunisian people of Irish descent
Irish people of Tunisian descent
English people of Tunisian descent
English people of Irish descent
2019 Africa Cup of Nations players
Ligue 2 players
Championnat National 3 players
Süper Lig players